Satria Tama Hardiyanto (born in Sidoarjo, 23 January 1997) is an Indonesian professional footballer who plays as a goalkeeper for Liga 1 club Persebaya Surabaya.

International career
In 2016, Satria Tama represented the Indonesia U-19, in the 2016 AFF U-19 Youth Championship. He made his international debut for senior team on 13 June 2017, against Puerto Rico replacing Kurnia Meiga at a half time.

Career statistics

Club

International

Honours

International 
Indonesia U-23
 Southeast Asian Games  Bronze medal: 2017
 AFF U-22 Youth Championship: 2019
Indonesia
 Aceh World Solidarity Cup runner-up: 2017

References

External links
 Satria Tama at Soccerway
 

1997 births
Living people
Indonesian footballers
People from Sidoarjo Regency
Sportspeople from East Java
Persegres Gresik players
Gresik United players
Madura United F.C. players
Persebaya Surabaya players
Liga 1 (Indonesia) players
Indonesia youth international footballers
Indonesia international footballers
Association football goalkeepers
Southeast Asian Games bronze medalists for Indonesia
Southeast Asian Games medalists in football
Competitors at the 2017 Southeast Asian Games
21st-century Indonesian people